Kheraikuchi is the locality in Guwahati, Assam, India; surrounded by the localities of Ghoramara, Sawkuchi and Bhetapara Often pronounced wrongly as Kerakuchi, which diverts from the Bodo Language meaning of the word Kheraikuchi.

See also
Bhangagarh
Jyotikuchi

References

Neighbourhoods in Guwahati